The Dayton Opera House was an historic opera house located at 318 Ferry Street in Dayton, Oregon, United States. It was added to the National Register of Historic Places on March 16, 1987. It was destroyed by a fire on December 9, 1993., and was subsequently delisted on July 21, 1998.

See also
 National Register of Historic Places listings in Yamhill County, Oregon

References

Buildings and structures in Dayton, Oregon
Event venues on the National Register of Historic Places in Oregon
Former National Register of Historic Places in Oregon
National Register of Historic Places in Yamhill County, Oregon
Opera houses on the National Register of Historic Places